Jeff Browning is an American ultramarathon runner and coach. After moving to Bend, Oregon, Browning transitioned from mountain biking to ultrarunning, and has since won more than two dozen 100 mile races. Previously a graphic designer, Browning has been a professional runner and coach since 2017. He was listed as one of the top 10 ultrarunners of the year by Ulrarunning Magazine in 2019, 2021, and 2022, and is the oldest runner ever to be included in these awards. He attributes his success and longevity in the sport to not only a high volume of running, but an additional focus on cross training, strength and mobility work, and adherence to a low carb, high fat diet.

Selected race results

Wins 
 Hardrock 100
 Bear 100 Mile Endurance Run
 Bighorn 100
 Moab 240
 Coldwater Rumble 100
 Mogollon Monster 100
 HURT 100
 Cascade Crest 100
 Tarawera 100

References

External links
 Personal website

American male ultramarathon runners
Living people
Year of birth missing (living people)
21st-century American people